Retief is an Afrikaans surname. It may refer to:
Piet Retief (1780–1838), prominent voortrekker
Glen Retief, South African writer
Johan Retief (born 1946), former Chief of the South African Navy
Johan Retief (rugby union) (born 1995), Namibian rugby union player
Lize-Mari Retief, (born 1986), South African swimmer
Jame Retief, fictional diplomat in Keith Laumer's series of science fiction stories

See also
Retief Goosen, South African professional golfer

Surnames of French origin
Afrikaans-language surnames